The page provides a list summary of the launches taken place in Satish Dhawan Space Centre. It is the main satellite launch centre for the Indian Space Research Organisation (ISRO). Originally called Sriharikota Range (SHAR), an acronym that ISRO has retained to the present day. The centre was renamed in 2002 after the death of ISRO's former chairman Satish Dhawan.

Launch statistics 

As of 26 November 2022, there have been a total of 84 launches, including 68 successful launches, 5 partial successes, and 10 failed launches.

By rocket
SLV: 4 (1 failure, 1 partial success & 2 successful)
ASLV: 4 (2 failures, 1 partial success & 1 successful)
PSLV: 56 (2 failures, 1 partial success & 53 successful)
GSLV: 14 (5 Failures, 1 partial success & 8 successful)
GSLV Mark III: 5 (0 Failures, 0 partial success & 5 successful)
SSLV: 2 (1 failure,  partial success & 1 successful)

By launch pad 
SLV Launch Pad: 8 (3 Failures, 2 partial success & 3 successful)
First Launch Pad: 45 (3 Failures, 1 partial success & 41 successful)
Second Launch Pad: 31 (5 Failures, 1 partial success & 25 successful)

By year

Launch log by ISRO

Other Test Launches By ISRO

Private Company Launches

Notes

References

External links
ISRO Launch Facility
SDSC Official Website

Lists of rocket launches
Space programme of India
list
India science and technology-related lists